Chandrabati Kotha is a 2019 Bengali biographical drama film directed by N. Rashed Chowdhury. The movie is based on the life of Chandravati, first feminist poet of Bengal.

The film premiered at the 2019 Kolkata International Film Festival. This movie has been selected for the international category for the Asia Pacific Screen Awards.

Plot
The story revolves with the elegiac life of Chandrabati, 16th century woman poet of Bengali language. She is best known for her women-centered epic Ramayana. Her father Dijabangshi Das was also a poet. Chandrabati falls in love with another poet, Jayananda. But he leaves her for another woman. Heartbroken Chandrabati confine herself inside a Shiva temple and start rewriting the Ramayana.

Cast
 Dilruba Hossain Doyel as Chandrabati
 Jayanta Chattopadhyay as Jayananda
 Quazi Nawshaba Ahmed as Sonai
 Gazi Rakayet
 Mita Chowdhury
 Imtiaz Barshon
 Tanay Biswas as Ashok

References

External links
 

2019 films
Bengali-language Bangladeshi films
Bangladeshi romantic drama films
Bangladeshi biographical films
2010s Bengali-language films
Government of Bangladesh grants films